Elections to Coventry City Council were held on 4 May 2006.  One third of the council was up for election and the Conservative party took overall control of the council.

After the election, the composition of the council was
Conservative 29
Labour 19
Socialist Alternative 3
Liberal Democrat 2
Independent 1

On 25 October 2006 Kate Hunter, a Councillor for Radford Ward, moved from the Labour Party to the Conservative Party.

On 17 January 2007 Val Stone, a former Councillor for Longford Ward, moved from being an Independent to the Conservative Party.

In April 2007 Mick Noonan, a Councillor for Wyken Ward, and Heather Rutter, a Councillor for Sherbourne Ward, moved from the Conservative Party to being Independents.

Election result

Ward results

References
 

2006
2006 English local elections
2000s in Coventry